John Arnfield Heap, CMG (5 February 1932 – 8 March 2006) was an English polar scientist who helped protect Antarctica from exploitation. His son Tom Heap is a reporter and broadcaster with the BBC.

Career 

John Heap was born in Manchester, England. He was educated at the Quaker-founded Leighton Park School in Reading and the University of Edinburgh where he studied geography. He began his career with pioneering research on Antarctic sea ice, for which he was awarded his doctorate at Clare College, Cambridge and the Scott Polar Research Institute (SPRI).

Dr Heap served with the Polar Regions Section of the Foreign and Commonwealth Office, and was head of the section between 1975 and 1992. He was than director of the SPRI in Cambridge from 1992 to 1997. After his retirement in 1997, he was chair of the UK Antarctic Heritage Trust and treasurer of the International Glaciological Society.

Personal life 

Heap married Margaret (Peggy) Spicer in 1960 and had two daughters, Sarah and Alice, and one son, Tom Heap, the BBC's Rural Affairs Correspondent and presenter of BBC One's Countryfile programme and a reporter for Panorama and BBC Radio 4's Costing the Earth programme.

References

External links 
 Scott Polar Research Institute information
 International Glaciological Society information
 Obituary, The Times, 24 March 2006
 Obituary, The Guardian, 4 April 2006

1932 births
2006 deaths
English geographers
English environmentalists
People educated at Leighton Park School
Alumni of Clare College, Cambridge
Companions of the Order of St Michael and St George
Scientists from Manchester
Alumni of the University of Edinburgh
People of the Scott Polar Research Institute